Tortugas Mountain is a mountain in southern New Mexico, in the village of Tortugas in Dona Ana County, New Mexico.  It is also known locally as 'A' Mountain.

There is a letter "A" on the mountain.

It is the site of the Tortugas Mountain Observatory, an astronomical observatory owned and operated by New Mexico State University.

A pilgrimage to the top of the mountain is part of the annual Fiesta of Our Lady of Guadalupe.  It is a  climb, which some participants do barefoot.

References

Mountains of Doña Ana County, New Mexico